Guinea competed at the 2014 Summer Youth Olympics, in Nanjing, China from 16 August to 28 August 2014.

Athletics

Guinea qualified two athletes.

Qualification Legend: Q=Final A (medal); qB=Final B (non-medal); qC=Final C (non-medal); qD=Final D (non-medal); qE=Final E (non-medal)

Boys
Track & road events

Girls
Track & road events

Judo

Guinea was given a quota to compete by the tripartite committee. However the athlete was barred from competing by the International Olympic Committee due to the Ebola outbreak in Guinea and the potential risk to other athletes.

Individual

Team

Swimming

Guinea qualified one swimmer. However the athlete was barred from competing by the International Olympic Committee due to the Ebola outbreak in Guinea and the potential risk to other athletes.

Boys

References

Oly
Nations at the 2014 Summer Youth Olympics
Guinea at the Youth Olympics